Ericka Campbell (born April 4, 1972), better known as Sundance, is an American rapper, DJ and radio personality.

Biography

Many details surrounding Ericka Campbell's birth and upbringing are unknown. Ericka's biological grandfather, Ethell Day Sr., was awarded custody of her just three months after her birth and remained in his custody until she was twelve years old. It is unclear why. She then moved briefly to Inglewood, California with her mother and stepfather but soon moved back to Chicago to live with her grandparents. Campbell attended Melody Elementary School and graduated from Maria Regina Catholic School in Gardena, California, a private elementary school. She then attended Morningside High School in Inglewood, California but upon returning to Chicago, she enrolled and graduated from Austin Community Academy High School on the West side of the city.

She took up DJing with a relative, and in the late 1980s recorded a house record with Fast Eddie, "Git On Up", that was certified Gold by RIAA and Billboard.

Afterwards, she went to cosmetology school and became a hairstylist.

In 1999, she pursued radio and landed a job at one of Clear Channel's urban stations in Chicago and was there for seven years. She is currently still DJing.

See also

List of number-one dance hits (United States)
List of artists who reached number one on the US Dance chart

References

1972 births
American dance musicians
American house musicians
American women DJs
African-American women rappers
American women rappers
Hip house musicians
Rappers from Chicago
Living people
Electronic dance music DJs
21st-century American rappers
21st-century American women musicians
21st-century women rappers
American women in electronic music
American women hip hop musicians
21st-century African-American musicians